Lucía Sainz Pelegri (born 5 October 1984) is a Spanish former professional tennis player and currently a professional padel player.

Tennis career
She has won six doubles titles on the ITF Women's Circuit. She decided to follow the college route and was part of the Fresno State Bulldogs tennis team from 2004 to 2006. Fresno State's Lucia Sainz has been named the Western Athletic Conference Women's Tennis Player of the Week for the week of February 28. Sainz retired from professional tennis in 2009.

Padel tennis career
Since 2015, she is a professional padel player where she has attained a world No. 1 ranking as of 2020. In 2018, she was awarded the Dona y Esport award as Barcelona's best athlete. She has been competing as a partner with Gemma Triay since 2016. Together with her, Sainz reached world No. 1 in 2020.

References

External links
 
 

1984 births
Living people
Spanish female tennis players
Female tennis players playing padel
Tennis players from Barcelona
Sportswomen from Catalonia
Fresno State Bulldogs women's tennis players
Spanish expatriate sportspeople in the United States